{{Infobox football club 
| clubname = Estudiantes de Xalapa
| image = Buhosxalapa.png
| image_size = 150px
| fullname =Estudiantes de Xalapa
| nickname = Buhos 
| founded = 2001
| disbanded = 
| ground = EL Canizo  , Xalapa, Veracruz
| capacity = 	1,000 
| chairman = Andres Espinoza Lopz| manager =  Abel Garcia Falfan| league = Tercera División de México
| season = Apertura 2011

| pattern_la1 = _stuttgart0708a
| pattern_b1  = _stuttgart0708a
| pattern_ra1 = _stuttgart0708a
| pattern_sh1 = _stuttgart0708a
| pattern_so1 = _sui12H
| leftarm1    = ED2300
| body1       = ED2300
| rightarm1   = ED2300
| shorts1     = ED2300
| socks1      = ED2300

| pattern_la2 = _stuttgart0708h
| pattern_b2  = _puma_red_horizontal_2013
| pattern_ra2 = _stuttgart0708h
| pattern_sh2 = _stuttgart0708h
| pattern_so2 = _sui12a
| leftarm2    = FEFEFE
| body2       = FEFEFE
| rightarm2   = FEFEFE
| shorts2     = FEFEFE
| socks2      = FEFEFE

| pattern_la3 = _goldshoulders
| pattern_b3  = _oita16h
| pattern_ra3 = _goldshoulders
| pattern_sh3 = _goldsides
| pattern_so3 = _2_gold_stripes
| leftarm3    = 0052BB
| body3       = 0052BB
| rightarm3   = 0052BB
| shorts3     = 0052BB
| socks3      = 0052BB

}} Estudiantes de Xalapa''' is a Mexican football club that plays in the Tercera División de México. The club is based in Xalapa, Veracruz.

See also
Football in Mexico
Veracruz
Tercera División de México

External links
Official Page

References 

Football clubs in Veracruz
2001 establishments in Mexico